Paul Julian Whitehouse (born 17 May 1958) is a Welsh actor, writer, presenter and comedian. He was one of the main stars of the BBC sketch comedy series The Fast Show, and has also starred with Harry Enfield in the shows Harry & Paul and Harry Enfield & Chums. He has also starred with Bob Mortimer in the BBC series Mortimer & Whitehouse: Gone Fishing. He has also acted in films appearing in Corpse Bride (2005), Alice in Wonderland (2010), and The Death of Stalin (2017).

In a 2005 poll to find The Comedian's Comedian, he was in the top 50 comedy acts voted for by comedians and comedy insiders.

Early life
Whitehouse was born on 17 May 1958, in Stanleytown, Glamorgan. His father, Harry, worked for the National Coal Board and his mother, Anita ( Jones), was a singer with the Welsh National Opera. The family moved to Enfield, Middlesex, when he was four years old, which led to his discovering his talent for mimicry:

Career 

Whitehouse attended the University of East Anglia "reading" for a degree in Development Studies from autumn 1976, where he made friends with Charlie Higson. The pair spent little of their first year studying, instead playing guitar and performing with their punk rock combo, the Right Hand Lovers.

Whitehouse dropped out and squatted in a council flat in Hackney, east London and occasionally worked as a plasterer. After Higson graduated in 1980, he moved in with Whitehouse, working by day as a decorator and performing at night and the weekends with his new punk-funk group The Higsons.

The pair began working as tradesmen on a house shared by comedians Stephen Fry and Hugh Laurie, which inspired them to start writing comedy. They moved to an estate where in a pub they met Harry Enfield, a neighbour with a stage act, and after he gained a place on Channel 4's Saturday Live, the pair were invited to write for him. Whitehouse created Enfield's character Stavros (a London-based Greek kebab shop owner), and then Loadsamoney (an archetypal Essex boy made good in Margaret Thatcher's 1980s); he also appeared as Enfield's sidekick Lance on Saturday Live.

This success turned Whitehouse and Higson's career, and they began to appear on Vic Reeves' Big Night Out and extensively for the BBC, with Whitehouse appearing on A Bit of Fry and Laurie as a man with a clinical need to have his bottom fondled, and Paul Merton: The Series, then on Harry Enfield's Television Programme, where he developed numerous characters including DJ Mike Smash of Smashie and Nicey, alongside Enfield as Dave Nice.

TV career 
While watching a preview tape of highlights from Enfield's programme, Whitehouse and Higson were inspired to create a rapid-fire delivery comedy series which would evolve into The Fast Show (when shown in the United States on BBC America, the show was titled Brilliant). Whitehouse's characters included Rowley Birkin QC, Unlucky Alf, Arthur Atkinson, Ron Manager and Ted.

An online series of The Fast Show commissioned by Fosters led to six weekly episodes launched on 10 November 2011.

In 2001 and 2002 Whitehouse and his Fast Show collaborator Dave Cummings co-wrote two series of the BBC comedy drama Happiness; Whitehouse also performed the lead role as a voice-over actor with a mid-life crisis.

Whitehouse wrote, produced and appeared with Chris Langham in the 2005 comedy drama Help, also for the BBC. In this series he took 25 roles, all patients of Langham's psychotherapist (except one, who is Langham's psychotherapist's psychotherapist). The pair's collaboration resulted in Whitehouse taking the witness stand on 24 July 2007 in the trial of Langham, in regard to the charge of holding explicit images and videos of minors. Langham claimed he downloaded this material as research for a character in the second series of Help, but Whitehouse's testimony only partially corroborated this explanation.

Whitehouse appeared in the BBC sketch series Harry & Paul (formerly Ruddy Hell! It's Harry and Paul), starring alongside Harry Enfield.

Whitehouse starred alongside Charlie Higson in the BBC2 comedy series Bellamy's People, with the first episode broadcast on 21 January 2010. The comedy evolved from the BBC Radio 4 program Down the Line. The show originally had the working title of Bellamy's Kingdom.

In October 2014 Harry Enfield and Whitehouse returned to the characters of Frank and George in a sketch for Channel 4's testicular cancer awareness comedy series The Feeling Nuts Comedy Night.

In 2015 his sitcom Nurse, based on his Radio 4 series of the same name (see below), debuted on BBC2 on 10 March.

In August 2015, Whitehouse, alongside Enfield, in celebration of their 25-year partnership, presented An Evening With Harry Enfield and Paul Whitehouse.

In June and July 2018 Whitehouse appeared with his long-time friend and fellow comedian Bob Mortimer in a delightful BBC2 six-part series, Mortimer & Whitehouse: Gone Fishing.  The two friends, who both suffer from heart conditions, share their thoughts and experiences while fishing at a variety of locations around the UK, often with anecdotes about Paul's health and Bob's misadventures. The fourth series of Gone Fishing began broadcasting in 2021. The fifth series began in September 2022, and returned for a Christmas special in December 2022.

Radio 
Whitehouse and Charlie Higson produced and appeared in a spoof phone-in show Down the Line on BBC Radio 4. The first series was broadcast May–June 2006. A second series was broadcast 16 January – 20 February 2007, during which they won a Sony Radio Academy Award. A third series was broadcast in January 2008, a fourth in January 2011 and a fifth in May 2013. In February 2014, Radio 4 broadcast Nurse, written by Whitehouse and David Cummings and starring Esther Coles in the title role, with Whitehouse playing a variety of characters, including Graham Downs who had previously appeared in Down the Line. The show would become the basis for the 2015 BBC Two TV series Nurse.

Theatre 
Whitehouse and John Sullivan's son, Jim Sullivan, have written Only Fools and Horses The Musical, which launched on 9 February 2019 at the Theatre Royal Haymarket, London. Whitehouse stars as Grandad. In October 2022 he temporarily handed the part over to Les Dennis.

Other 
He also starred alongside Eddie Large and Russ Abbot in episode 4 of Horne & Corden. Comic Relief 2011 contained a new parody video of "Newport (Ymerodraeth State of Mind)" directed by MJ Delaney featuring Whitehouse and other Welsh celebrities lip-syncing to the song. It is available to download via iTunes.

Johnny Depp described Whitehouse as "the greatest actor of all time".. Depp and Whitehouse have appeared in five films together.

Influences 
Whitehouse's main early influences were the sketches of Les Dennis and Dustin Gee and The Goodies. In 2001, when asked about comedians who had influenced him, Whitehouse said that Monty Python, Peter Cook and Dudley Moore were the main influences from when he was young. He also cited his modern influences as Harry Enfield, of whom he said without meeting he would not have been doing what he does now, and the approach of Reeves and Mortimer who he described as "far and away the best comedians that we have had in this country for a long while."

Personal life 
Whitehouse has four daughters. Sophie, Molly, Lauren and Delilah.  Whitehouse and his wife Fiona were married for eight years and had two daughters, Molly and Sophie, before they divorced in the early 2000s. He met Mine Conkbayir, aged 23, when she was working in a shop while she studied. The couple have one daughter, Delilah.
Whitehouse is a fan of Tottenham Hotspur F.C.

Filmography

Film

Television

Awards and nominations

References

Notes

External links 
 BBC – South East Wales – Hall of Fame – Paul Whitehouse
 BBC Comedy Guide
 

1958 births
20th-century British male actors
21st-century British male actors
Male actors from London
Comedians from London
Alumni of the University of East Anglia
Living people
Best Entertainment Performance BAFTA Award (television) winners
People from Enfield, London
People from Islington (district)
People from Rhondda Cynon Taf
British male television actors
British male film actors
British comedy writers
British male radio actors
British male comedians
British sketch comedians
20th-century squatters
The Fast Show